Lorenzo Paolucci (born 1 October 1996) is an Italian football player. He plays for  club Ancona.

Club career
He made his Serie B debut for Pescara on 17 January 2015 in a game against Trapani.

On 17 July 2019, he signed a 3-year contract with Reggina. On 4 September 2020 he returned to Monopoli on a season-long loan.

On 30 June 2021, he signed a three-year contract with Belgian club Union SG.

On 19 August 2022, Paolucci returned to Italy and joined Ancona.

Personal life
His older brother Andrea Paolucci is also a football player.
His younger brother, Alex Paolucci, is also a football player and model in Tollo, Abruzzo.

References

External links
 

1996 births
Sportspeople from Pescara
Footballers from Abruzzo
Living people
Italian footballers
Delfino Pescara 1936 players
S.S. Teramo Calcio players
Taranto F.C. 1927 players
S.S. Monopoli 1966 players
Reggina 1914 players
Royale Union Saint-Gilloise players
Ancona-Matelica players
Serie B players
Serie C players
Belgian Pro League players
Association football midfielders
Italian expatriate footballers
Expatriate footballers in Belgium
Italian expatriate sportspeople in Belgium